St. Paul's Walden Bury is an English country house and surrounding gardens in the village of St Paul's Walden in Hertfordshire. The house is a Grade II* listed, and the gardens Grade I.

A home of the Bowes-Lyon family, it is possibly the site of the birth of Queen Elizabeth, the Queen Mother.

The garden wilderness, or highly formalized woodland, is a very rare survival, and the "most perfect surviving" English example. It was laid out in the 1730s with straight walks in the old formal style, when these were already becoming rather unfashionable. 

The house, of red brick with stone dressings and slate roofs, was built around the 1730s for Edward Gilbert (1680–1762). His daughter Mary married George Bowes of Gibside, Durham, and the estate has been in the possession of the Bowes or Bowes-Lyon family since 1720. James Paine made alterations to the house in the 1770s, which was also extended to the rear in the late nineteenth century.

Gardens
The St Paul's Walden Bury gardens' design is largely contemporary with the house, with additional 19th and 20th-century woodland garden areas. Geoffrey Jellicoe (1900–1996), the landscape designer, restored and "improved" the 18th-century work. There are three straight grassed allées radiating in patte d'oie ("goose foot") formation from the garden front of the house. The garden is notable for one of the best surviving formal wildernesses.  Each allée is flanked by clipped beech hedges. In the 1950s a circular temple designed by James Wyatt was rescued and brought here from Copped Hall, Essex, when that house burned down.  There are a number of other garden buildings and statues, some 18th-century, and an 18th-century walled kitchen garden, nearly square and divided in two parts by a further wall.

In 1987 the gardens were designated Grade I on the Register of Historic Parks and Gardens of Special Historic Interest in England.

References

External links
 St Paul's Walden Bury – Official website
 St. Paul's Walden Bury entry from The DiCamillo Companion to British & Irish Country Houses

Houses in Hertfordshire
Grade II* listed buildings in Hertfordshire
Grade II* listed houses
Gardens in Hertfordshire
Grade I listed parks and gardens in Hertfordshire
Gardens by Geoffrey Jellicoe
Woodland gardens